2-Furonitrile is a colorless derivative of furan possessing a nitrile group.

Synthesis 
Industrial synthesis is based on the vapor phase ammoxidation of furfural with ammonia over bismuth molybdate catalyst at 440-480 °C.

Numerous laboratory methods also exist; for the instance oxidative dehydration of furfural with ammonia salts using hypervalent iodine reagents or n-bromosuccinimide. From furfural aldoxime (with thionyl chloride-benzotriazole, triphenylphosphine-iodine reagents, or heating in DMSO) and furoic acid amide (flash vacuum pyrolysis).

Applications 
2-Furonitrile currently has no major applications but it is used as an intermediate in pharmaceutical and fine chemical synthesis. It has been suggested as a potential sweetening agent, as it has about thirty times the sweetening power of sucrose.

References 

2-Furyl compounds
Nitriles